Mary Jean Balse-Pabayo (born May 31, 1983) is a Filipina volleyball player. She currently plays for the Army Black Mamba Lady Troopers volleyball team in the Premier Volleyball League. She was a member of the Philippines women's national volleyball team that won the bronze medal in the 2005 Southeast Asian Games.

Clubs 
  UST Golden Tigresses  (2004-2009)
  Lyceum Lady Pirates as guest player (2010)
  Generika-Army Lady Troopers (2014)
  RC Cola-Army Troopers (2016)
  COCOLIFE Asset Managers (2017-2018)
  Smart Giga Hitters (2018)
  Pacific Town - Army Lady Troopers (2019)
  Petron Blaze Spikers (2020)
  Philippine Army Lady Troopers (2008-present)

Awards

Individual
 2004 Shakey's V-League Season 1 First Conference "Conference Most Valuable Player"
 2004 UAAP Season 67 "Rookie of the Year"
 2005 Shakey's V-League Season 2 First Conference "Best Receiver"
 2005 Shakey's V-League Season 2 Second Conference "Best Server"
 2007 Shakey's V-League Season 4 First Conference "Finals Most Valuable Player"
 2007 Shakey's V-League Season 4 First Conference "Best Attacker"
 2007 UAAP Season 70 "Best Attacker"
 2009 Shakey's V-League Season 6 First Conference "Conference Most Valuable Player"
 2010 Shakey's V-League Season 7 Second Conference "Best Attacker"
 2011 Shakey's V-League Season 8 SEA Club Invitational "Best Server"
 2013 Shakey's V-League Season 10 Second Conference "Best Server"
 2014 PSL All-Filipino Conference "2nd Best Middle Blocker"

Collegiate
 2004 Shakey's V-League Season 1 First Conference - -   Champion, with UST Tigresses
 2004 UAAP Season 67 -  - -   Runner-up, with UST Tigresses
 2005 Shakey's V-League Season 2 First Conference  - Runner-up, with UST Tigresses
 2005 Shakey's V-League Season 2 Second Conference  - Runner-up, with UST Tigresses
 2006 UAAP Season 69 -  - Champion, with UST Tigresses
 2007 Shakey's V-League Season 4 First Conference -   - Champion, with UST Tigresses
 2007 Shakey's V-League Season 4 Second Conference -   - Champion, with UST Tigresses
 2007 UAAP Season 70 -  - Bronze medal, with UST Tigresses
 2008 UAAP Season 71 -  - Bronze medal, with UST Tigresses
 2009 Shakey's V-League Season 6 First Conference -  - Champion, with UST Tigresses
 2009 Shakey's V-League Season 6 Second Conference -   - Champion, with UST Tigresses
 2010 Shakey's V-League Season 7 First Conference -   - Champion, with UST Tigresses
 2010 Shakey's V-League Season 7 Second Conference -   - Bronze medal, with Lyceum Lady Pirates

Club
 2011 Shakey's V-League Season 8 Open Conference -  - Champion, with Philippine Army Lady Troopers
 2011 Shakey's V-League Season 8 SEA Club Invitational Conference -   - Runner-up, with Philippine Army Lady Troopers
 2012 Shakey's V-League Season 9 Open Conference -  - Bronze medal, with Philippine Army Lady Troopers
 2013 Shakey's V-League Season 10 Open Conference -  - Bronze medal, with Philippine Army Lady Troopers
 2013 PSL Invitational Conference -  - Champion, with Philippine Army Lady Troopers
 2013 PSL Grand Prix Conference -  -  - Champion, with Philippine Army Lady Troopers
 2014 Shakey's V-League 11th Season Open Conference -  - Champion, with Philippine Army Lady Troopers
 2014 Shakey's V-League 11th Season Reinforced Conference -  - Runner-up, with Philippine Army Lady Troopers
 2014 PSL All-Filipino Conference -  - Champion, with Generika-Army Lady Troopers
 2015 Shakey's V-League 12th Season Open Conference -  - Runner-up, with Philippine Army Lady Troopers
 2015 Shakey's V-League 12th Season Reinforced Conference -  - Runner-up, with Philippine Army Lady Troopers
 2016 PSL Invitational Cup -  - Champion, with RC Cola-Army Troopers
 2016 PSL All-Filipino Conference -  - Bronze medal, with RC Cola-Army Troopers
 2019 Premier Volleyball League Reinforced Conference -  - Bronze medal, with Pacific Town - Army Lady Troopers

National team
 2003 Southeast Asian Games -  - Bronze medal
 2005 Southeast Asian Games -  - Bronze medal

References 

Living people
University of Santo Tomas alumni
University Athletic Association of the Philippines volleyball players
1983 births
Middle blockers
Philippines women's international volleyball players
Filipino women's volleyball players
Southeast Asian Games bronze medalists for the Philippines
Southeast Asian Games medalists in volleyball
Competitors at the 2005 Southeast Asian Games
Sportspeople from Davao del Norte
21st-century Filipino women